Save Me, San Francisco is the fifth studio album by pop rock band Train (and the first of two albums recorded as a three-piece). It was released on October 26, 2009, through Columbia Records. The album was certified Platinum by the Recording Industry Association of America on April 7, 2021.

The album's first single, "Hey, Soul Sister", which marked a return to the group's folk-rock roots, was released to digital retailers on August 11, 2009. The single has since become Train's fourth career Top 40 hit on the Billboard Hot 100 and second career top 10 hit, reaching number three 26 weeks after it was released. It is also the band's highest-peaking single to date in their native United States, as well as Canada, Australia, the Netherlands and New Zealand.

The follow-up single, "If It's Love", became Train's fourth-career chart-topping single on the Adult Top 40 and peaking at #34 on the Billboard Hot 100. "Marry Me" was released on October 25 as the third single from the record — it debuted on the Billboard Hot 100 at #95 and has reached #34. "Save Me, San Francisco" was released on April 25, 2011 as the fifth single from the record, and peaked at #75 on the Hot 100.

Background

Despite debuting in the Top Ten of the Billboard 200 and garnering numerous positive reviews, the band's previous album, For Me, It's You, was a commercial failure, lacking longevity on the aforementioned chart and being the first Train album to fail to garner an RIAA certification or spawn a Billboard Hot 100-charting single.

The band has since attributed the album's failure to resonate to listeners to their own internal struggles at the time. After considering breaking up altogether at one point, the band finally decided to take a hiatus and pursue solo projects. Lead singer and lyricist Pat Monahan recorded his debut solo record, Last of Seven, which was released in September 2007, shortly after the band went on hiatus. Despite garnering positive reviews, the album was a commercial failure, debuting and peaking at a disappointing #82 on the Billboard 200 composite chart.

In early 2009, in an effort to restore the band, the now-trio regrouped. Lead guitarist Jimmy Stafford reflected on their intentions at the time:

After deciding to change management and restore the band to its core trio, the band found motivation in writing new songs; reportedly writing a total of 80. The band also made a habitual departure from collaborating with a sole producer each previous album era in deciding to record and collaborate with numerous producers, including famed producer and frontman of OneRepublic Ryan Tedder, Dave Katz and Sam Hollander of the 2008 Rolling Stone Hot List Producers of the Year-awarded recording duo S*A*M & Sluggo, and Espen Lind and Amund Bjørklund of the famed Norwegian producing duo Espionage, who produced and co-wrote the album's single "Hey, Soul Sister" and the album track "Brick by Brick".

Lead singer and lyricist Pat Monahan attributed the band's new-found momentum to approaching their work ethic with a happy disposition:

The recording sessions, according to the band, also marked a return to the band's roots; both musically as well as culturally to their native San Francisco:

Reception

With their diminished commercial standing at the time of its release, Save Me San Francisco debuted at #17 on the Billboard 200, their first album not to debut in the chart's Top Ten since their self-titled debut release. The album quickly descended the chart in subsequent weeks until, at one point, it exited the Billboard 200 altogether.

However, buoyed by the breakout success of Train's biggest single to date ("Hey, Soul Sister"), the album enjoyed a resurgence; steadily climbing the Billboard 200 back to a position of #20 the chart week of August 21, 2010, 39 weeks after its release. The album is certified Gold by the RIAA, and has sold 954,000 copies as of April, 2012.

The album also enjoyed modest levels of international success to date. After their previous album For Me, It's You failed to chart the ARIA Albums chart altogether, Save Me, San Francisco reached a peak of #8 on the aforementioned chart: their best chart showing since Drops of Jupiter peaked at #3 in 2001.

Track listing

Notes
"I Got You" contains elements of "Black Water" as written by Patrick Simmons, and performed by The Doobie Brothers.

Personnel
Train
Pat Monahan - lead and backing vocals
Jimmy Stafford - guitars
Scott Underwood - drums & percussion

Additional musicians
Sean Gould - bass & slide guitar on track 1
Claes Bjorklund - various keyboards on tracks 1, 2, 3, 7, 8 & 10, synthesizers on track 5, programming on track 7, piano & Mellotron on track 11
Sakai - backing vocals on tracks 1 & 8
Nikita Germaine - backing vocals on tracks 1 & 8
Jerry Becker - honky piano on track 1, Hammond organ on track 2, various keyboards on tracks 4 & 6, piano on track 5
The Ghost Of Harlem Keyboards - piano on track 1
Martin Terefe - bass on tracks 2, 3, 5, 7, 8 & 10
Espen Lind - ukulele & keyboards on track 2, piano & bass guitar on track 9
Gregg Wattenberg - bass on track 4
Andreas Olsson - programming on track 5
Josh Berger - bass on track 6
Nikolaj Torp - Hammond organ on track 8
The Lovesponge Strings - strings on tracks 5, 6, 8 & 9
David Davidson - violin & string arrangements on tracks 5, 6, 8 & 9
David Angell - violin on tracks 5, 6, 8 & 9
Kristin Wilkinson - viola on tracks 5, 6, 8 & 9
Sarighani Reist - cello on tracks 5, 6, 8 & 9

Production
Mark Endert - mixing
Ted Jensen - mastering at Sterling Sound in New York, NY

Chart performance

Weekly charts

Year-end charts

Certifications

References

2009 albums
Train (band) albums
Columbia Records albums
Albums produced by Gregg Wattenberg